The Collin McKinney House is a historic house located at 1106 SE 7th Street in Wagoner, Oklahoma, United States. The house is a two-story, rectangular structure built in 1900.

It was added to the National Register of Historic Places in 1982.

References

Houses in Wagoner County, Oklahoma
Houses on the National Register of Historic Places in Oklahoma
Houses completed in 1900
National Register of Historic Places in Wagoner County, Oklahoma